The 2016 Andorran Supercup was played on 11 September 2016, at Estadi Comunal in Andorra la Vella.  This was the fourteenth Andorran Supercup.  It was won 1–0 by UE Santa Coloma.

Route to the final
FC Santa Coloma qualified by winning the 2015–16 Primera Divisió.  UE Santa Coloma qualified by winning the 2016 Copa Constitució.

Details

References

2016
Supercup